The WHA Entry Draft was the entry draft for the World Hockey Association. The professional league operated from 1972 to 1979, but only held its annual draft from 1973 through 1978.

The fledgling WHA had some trouble stocking their teams, with many of the players drafted by WHA teams never reporting, preferring instead to play in the long established National Hockey League. In 1975, only three of the fifteen first-round picks played a game in the new league. Other players would only be lured with extravagant salaries, such as the $1.3 million ($ million today) contract Pat Price signed with the Vancouver Blazers in 1974.

The WHA held a secretive, short draft in February of 1978 without releasing the names of the drafted players with the expectation of having their regular amateur draft in June of that year.  The June draft was never held.

First overall picks
List of first overall picks:

Of the five first overall draft picks selected in the WHA Amateur Draft, Bob Neely and Blair Chapman never reported to the league. Pat Price, drafted after a 95-point season as a defenceman in junior hockey, was considered an expensive flop, though he was drafted by the New York Islanders after only one year in Vancouver and went on to a 13-year career in the NHL. Only Scott Campbell and Claude Larose had reasonably active and prosperous WHA careers.

The WHA draft was abandoned in 1978 when merger talks with the NHL broke down.  The league instead encouraged teams to negotiate with junior players as free agents, including underage players.

See also
WHA General Player Draft
NHL Entry Draft

References

Draft1111